Jeroen van Dijk (born 26 August 1971) is a Dutch badminton player. He competed in the men's singles tournament at the 1996 Summer Olympics.

References

External links
 

1971 births
Living people
Dutch male badminton players
Olympic badminton players of the Netherlands
Badminton players at the 1996 Summer Olympics
Sportspeople from Rotterdam
20th-century Dutch people